The Museo Nacional de Arqueología Antropología e Historia del Perú (English: National Museum of Archaeology, Anthropology, and History of Peru) is the largest and oldest museum in Peru, located on Plaza Bolívar in the Pueblo Libre district of Lima. The museum houses more than 100,000 artifacts spanning the entire history of human occupation in what is now Peru. Highlights include the Raimondi Stele and the Tello Obelisk from Chavín de Huantar, and an impressive scale model of the Incan citadel, Machu Picchu.

See also
Museums in Lima

References

External links

  National Museum website

Archaeology, National Museum
Anthropology museums
Archaeological museums in Peru
Pre-Columbian art museums
Spanish Colonial architecture in Peru
1822 establishments in the Spanish Empire
Museums established in 1826